The McDonnell Douglas (later Boeing) MD-90 is an American five-abreast single-aisle airliner developed by McDonnell Douglas from its successful model MD-80. The airliner was produced by the developer company until 1997 and then by Boeing Commercial Airplanes. It was a stretched derivative of the MD-80 and thus the third generation of the DC-9 family.

After the more fuel-efficient IAE V2500 high-bypass turbofan was selected, Delta Air Lines became the launch customer on November 14, 1989.
The MD-90 first flew on February 22, 1993, and the first delivery was in February 1995 to Delta.

The MD-90 competed with the Airbus A320ceo family and the Boeing 737 Next Generation.
Its 5 ft (1.4 m) longer fuselage seats 153 passengers in a mixed configuration over up to 2,455 nmi (4,547 km), making it the largest member of the DC-9 family. It kept the MD-88's electronic flight instrument system (EFIS).

The shrunken derivative of MD-80 or shorter variant of MD-90, originally marketed as MD-95, was later renamed the Boeing 717 following McDonnell Douglas' merger with Boeing in 1997.

Production ended in 2000 after 116 deliveries. Delta Air Lines flew the final MD-90 passenger flight on June 2, 2020, marking the retirement of the type.
It was involved in three hull-loss accidents with only one fatality being a fire related or non-aeronautical accident.

Development
The DC-9 series, the first generation of the DC-9 family with five members or variants (DC-9-10 / DC-9 Series 10, Series 20, Series 30, Series 40, and Series 50) and ten production versions (Series 11, Series 12, Series 14, Series 15, Series 21, Series 31, Series 32, Series 33, Series 34, Series 41, and Series 51), was a commercial success with 976 units built when production ended in 1982. The aircraft series was an all-new design, using two rear fuselage-mounted turbofan engines, a T-tail configuration, and  a  narrow-body fuselage design with five-abreast seating for 80 to 135 passengers. The success prompted the manufacturer to further develop the first generation DC-9 family into its second generation.

Baseline: MD-80
The MD-80 series, the first derivative or the second generation of the DC-9 family, entered service in 1980. The aircraft series was originally designated as Series 80 or stylized as the Super 80, which was a 14 ft 3 in (4.34 m) lengthened Series 50 with a higher maximum take-off weight (MTOW) and higher fuel capacity, as well as next-generation Pratt and Whitney JT8D-200 series engines and an improved wing design. The MD-80 series has five variants or production versions, which are designated with a non-zero second digit similar to the DC-9 series, the MD-81, MD-82, MD-83, MD-87, and the MD-88. A total of 1,191 MD-80 airliners were delivered from 1980 to 1999, making it the company's most successful airliner model.
In 1983, McDonnell Douglas began studies on derivatives of the MD-80 series or the third generation of the DC-9 family, which later became known as the MD-90 series.

Stretching: MD-90

The MD-90, the stretched derivative of the MD-80 and thus the third generation of the DC-9 family, was launched on November 14, 1989 when Delta Air Lines placed an order for 50 MD-90s, with options to purchase a further 110 aircraft. The type was 57-inch-longer (1.4 m) longer than MD-80 and featured a glass cockpit (electronic instrumentation) and more powerful, quieter, fuel-efficient IAE V2525-D5 engines, with the option of upgrading to an IAE V2528 engine.

Large stretch: MD-90X
Starting in late 1986, McDonnell Douglas began offering the MD-90X, a  stretch of the MD-80. Unlike the MD-91 and MD-92 derivatives and the clean-sheet MD-94X proposal, the MD-90X would still use turbofan engines. The MD-90X would carry 180 passengers. Powered by the  CFM56-5 or V2500, the MD-90X replaced the MD-89 as McDonnell Douglas's proposed new turbofan offering, and it was designed to compete with the Boeing 757.

Propfan engine

Civilian: MD-94X

For several years, McDonnell Douglas proposed powering the MD-90 with two unducted fan (UDF) or propfan engines, designated the MD-94X. Previously, an MD-81 was used as a testbed for propfan engines, such as the General Electric GE36 and the Pratt & Whitney/Allison 578-DX.

By mid-1989, it was clear that there was insufficient interest in propfan-powered aircraft, so the company reworked its proposals to instead feature the IAE V2500 turbofan, which was estimated to be $1 million cheaper than the GE36 and had already been certified for the Airbus A320. Within six weeks of eliminating the propfan option, the MD-90 secured a large launch order.

Military: P-9D
When the United States Navy wanted to replace its 125 Lockheed P-3 Orion anti-submarine warfare (ASW) aircraft, McDonnell Douglas offered the P-9D, which would be a propfan-powered version of the MD-91. The  thrust engine would be either the General Electric GE36 or the Pratt & Whitney/Allison 578-DX. Lockheed won the competition with its P-3 derivative, the Lockheed P-7, but the replacement program was later canceled.

Shrinking: MD-95

In 1991, McDonnell Douglas revealed that it was again considering developing a specialized 100-seat version of the MD-80, to be some  shorter than the MD-87, powered with engines in the  thrust class. At the Paris Airshow, McDonnell Douglas announced the development of a 105-seat version of the MD-80, designated MD-95. In early 1994, the MD-95 re-emerged as similar to the DC-9-30, its specified weight, dimensions, and fuel capacity being almost identical. At this time, McDonnell Douglas said that it expected the MD-95 to become a family of aircraft with the capability of increased range and seating capacity. The MD-95 was developed to satisfy the market need to replace early DC-9s, then approaching 30 years old. The MD-95 was a complete overhaul, going back to the original DC-9-30 design and applying new engines, cockpit and other more modern systems.
McDonnell Douglas first offered the MD-95 for sale in 1994. The airliner was later renamed the Boeing 717-200 after McDonnell Douglas merged with Boeing in 1997.

Entry into service
The type first flew on February 22, 1993, and the first MD-90 was delivered to Delta in February 1995.
No MD-90 orders were received after Boeing and McDonnell Douglas merged in 1997 due to internal competition with Boeing's 737. Delta Air Lines had initially placed a large order for the MD-90 to replace some aging Boeing 727s. After the Boeing-McDonnell Douglas merger, Delta canceled their remaining 19 MD-90 orders in favor of the Boeing 737–800.

Production
The MD-90 was produced adjacent to the Long Beach Airport in Long Beach, California, USA. A total of 40 MD-90s (later 20) were to be assembled under contract in Shanghai, People's Republic of China under the Trunkliner program, but Boeing's decision to phase out the MD-90 resulted in only two built by Shanghai Aircraft. MD-90 production at Long Beach, California ended in 2000 with the last airplane being delivered to Saudi Arabian Airlines, and MD-90T production at Shanghai ended in 2000.  With 116 MD-90 aircraft produced, the MD-90 production run was the smallest among the DC-9 family. Two aircraft were also produced at Jiangwan Airfield in Shanghai, People's Republic of China.

Retirement
The main competitors of the MD-90 included the Airbus A320ceo and the Boeing 737–800. Aeronautical Engineers Inc (AEI) planned to begin an MD-90 freighter conversion program in 2016/2017 when the 737-400SF conversions were expected to be phased out, but canceled it in 2015. A converted MD-90 freighter would be longer than a 12-pallet capacity MD-80SF and would have one more pallet position, or 13 pallets total. However, as with the MD-80SF, the narrow fuselage cross-section only allows for non-standard 88" x 108" pallets or containers, which is the main disadvantage in cargo operations and limits its potential market. The main reason for AEI's decision not to continue the 13-pallet freighter program was the limited availability of MD-90 in the market.. At the time, fewer than 100 aircraft were still active, most of which were in Delta Air Lines fleet. On June 2, 2020, Delta operated its last MD-90 on the type's final commercial flights, and so the MD-90 was retired without a freighter conversion to extend its service life.

Design

The MD-90 is a mid-size, medium-range airliner that was developed from the MD-80 series. This made the MD-90 the first derivative variant of the DC-9 to use a high-bypass turbofan engine. Due to the heavier engines, the engine pylons feature flaps that deflect 30° downward to assist in pitching down for stall recovery. The system activates automatically when the control column is pushed fully forward.

Typical seating for the MD-90 ranges from 153 to 172 passengers, depending on the cabin configuration and interior layout. The MD-90 was produced in two versions: -30 and −30ER. An even longer-range version, the −50, was offered but was never ordered.

The initial MD-90s feature an EFIS cockpit similar to the MD-88's cockpit. The 29 MD-90s delivered to Saudi Arabian Airlines feature a full glass cockpit with avionics and an overhead display panel similar to the MD-11's cockpit for easy transition for the airline's pilots of the MD-11, also operated by the airline.

Variants

MD-90-10 A shorter variant with the same length as the MD-87, carrying from 114 passengers in a three-class layout to 139 passengers in a high-density configuration. Engine thrust would be . This variant was not built.
MD-90-20 Retrofit of MD-80 series aircraft to V2500 engines.

MD-90-30 Base variant with two V2525-D5 engines and an EFIS cockpit similar to that of the MD-88.  This engine also has an option to add 3,000 lbf for use in Hot & High conditions if needed by activating a switch in the flight deck.
MD-90-30IGW Increased Gross Weight version, one built.
MD-90-30ER Extended Range (ER) version of MD-90-30, two built.
MD-90-30T "Trunkliner" Variant of the MD-90-30 assembled by Shanghai Aviation Industrial Corporation in the People's Republic of China. Production was initially planned to be 40, later reduced to 20, with only two built in the end. To accommodate the heavy aircraft on unsuitable runways, a dual tandem landing gear with more tires to spread the weight of the aircraft was designed for the Trunkliner, but ultimately not used in the two aircraft produced. The Comac ARJ21 is built using tooling retained by the Chinese after the end of the Chinese MD-90-30 program.
MD-90-30EFD Enhanced Flight Deck version of MD-90 with similar instrumentation to the MD-11, 28 built.
MD-90-40 A proposed  variant with a maximum capacity of up to 217 passengers, though the normal three-class layout would hold 170–180 passengers. Engine thrust would be . This variant was never built.
Other improvements include wing area enlargement/strengthening, adoption of MD-11 avionics, one-person baggage loading improvements, and better interiors.
MD-90-50ERA proposed variant similar to the MD-90-30, but with two extra auxiliary fuel tanks mounted on the belly.
MD-90-55 A proposed variant with two extra passenger doors and room for 187 passengers in a single-class configuration.

Operators

Delta Air Lines was the last remaining operator in 2020. Delta began phasing out its MD-90s in 2017, before retiring its remaining MD-90s after their final flights on June 2, 2020.

Deliveries

Accidents and incidents

During its service life, the MD-90 was involved in three hull-loss accidents, resulting in one fatality.

Accidents 
 On August 24, 1999, Uni Air Flight 873, a MD-90, caught fire after a passenger's carry-on luggage containing gasoline was ignited by a motorcycle battery contained in another passenger's carry-on luggage. 27 people were injured with one fatality as a result of the cabin fire. The aircraft was damaged beyond economic repair.
On March 9, 2009, a Lion Air MD-90 overran runway 25L at Soekarno–Hatta International Airport, due to an unstable approach 330 ft (100 m) before the runway in rainfall and strong winds, in which the aircraft touched down to the left of the centerline. Although its thrust reversers were functioning, it veered to the right, resulting in the aircraft resting 90 degrees off the runway.
On May 8, 2009, a Saudi Arabian Airlines MD-90 with seven crew members and no passengers on a repositioning flight from Jeddah was substantially damaged during a runway excursion accident at Riyadh airport. On touchdown, the captain manually extended the speed brake (spoiler) lever, but did not latch it in the fully extended (EXT) position (fully aft and latched upwards), and the lever automatically returned to the forward retracted (RET) position which was not noticed by the cockpit crew. After touchdown, the aircraft banked to the right and began to drift right of the runway center line and left the runway at high speed, traversed the full width of the G4 taxiway, where the left main landing gear collapsed during this time. The aircraft came to rest on taxiway GOLF and all crew members escaped with no injuries.

Incidents 
On February 23, 2009, a Lion Air MD-90 with 156 passengers and 6 members, performing flight JT-972 from Medan to Batam in Indonesia, could not extend the nose gear while on approach to runway 04 of Batam's Hang Nadim International Airport. The crew aborted the approach and circled the airport which trying to troubleshoot the problem. After around one hour, they were forced to land without the nose gear at around 18:30 local time (11:30GMT). The airport’s emergency services had sprayed foam on the runway for the landing, which the crew performed safely.

Specifications

See also

References

Sources
 Becher, Thomas. Douglas Twinjets, DC-9, MD-80, MD-90 and Boeing 717. The Crowood Press, 2002. .
 Swanborough, Gordon. "A 'Ninety for the 'Nineties". Air International, August 1993, Vol 45 No 2. Stamford, UK:Key Publishing. pp. 90–95

External links 

 MD-90/MD-80 history page on Boeing.com
 MD-90 page on Airliners.net

 
1990s United States airliners
MD-090
Twinjets
T-tail aircraft
Low-wing aircraft
Aircraft first flown in 1993